These hits topped the Dutch Top 40 in 1978.

See also
1978 in music

References

1978 in the Netherlands
1978 record charts
1978